Çamaş is a town and district of Ordu Province in the Black Sea region of Turkey. According to the 2000 census, population of the district is 13,650 of which 10,047 live in the town of Çamaş.

The villages of Çamaş district include Budak, Edirli, Hisarbey, Sakargeriş, Saitler, and Söken.

Notes

References

External links

 District governor's official website 
 Road map of Çamaş and environs

Populated places in Ordu Province
Districts of Ordu Province
Towns in Turkey